Ektal or Ektaal is a tala in Indian music. It is  commonly used in classical music like kheyal, and semi-classical forms like Rabindra Sangeet. In ektal the 12 matras are divided into 6 vibhags of two matras each. Ektal is played in Drut gatti ( fast speed ). This tala is mostly played by the use of tabla. One more tala similar to Ektal is Chowtal which is played with the use of Pakhavaj,Ektaal is the tabla counterpart of Chowtaal. Many beautiful Kaida are played in Ektal. But Ektal is mostly played for Vilambit (slow pace of any Tal) .

Basic information on tal Ektal : 

Name - Ektal

Sum - 1st matra

Tali (claps) - 1, 5, 9, 11 matras

Khali (wave) - 3, 7 matras

Similar talas - Chowtal, Dadra, Garba (tal)

Related instruments -  Tabla

Related to - Hindustani  music

The form of Ektal is as follows:

clap, tap, wave, tap, clap, tap, wave, tap, clap, tap, clap, tap
                                                                                        
It has a characteristic pattern of bols (theka) which goes as follows:

It is very important in Indian Classical music and many compositions are based on it. The 'Tirkita' is played as 'Traka' in the drut gatti or fast laya.

References

Hindustani talas

 https://chandrakantha.com/

Ektaal 12 beats which are very popular shastriya taal in North Indian music.This taal is also called ektala.
This taal has 6 divisions with 2 beats in each division.4th claps of this rhythm on 1st,5th,9th, and 11th beats and 2 waves on 3rd and 7th beats. The 1st beat of rhythm is called 'Sam'which is place is 1st clap.